Yilgarn River is a river in the eastern Wheatbelt region of Western Australia. At its junction with Lockhart River, their combined flow passes through a hydrological-topographical pinch-point at Caroline Gap, a geomorphic saddle between Mt Caroline and Mt Stirling. 

It originates in the region east from Southern Cross and west from Coolgardie. From Lake Seabrook and Lake Deborah it flows generally west, skirting north of Bullfinch, then to the south-west past Merredin and south of Kellerberrin to its confluence with the Lockhart River at Caroline Gap.

Catchment rivers
The Yilgarn River catchment area is drained by the rivers:

 Yilgarn River originating from southeast from Lake Seabrook and Boorabbin
 Belka River draining from southwest from Merredin
 Mulka River draining from north of Lake Brown

Stream flow
Studies in 2008-09 gave the average annual total flow for the Yilgarn River as 4 GL (compared to 13 GL for the Lockhart River). Streamflow salinity in the Yilgarn River is about two-thirds that of sea-water.

Waterway assessments
The river was extensively surveyed in 2008/2009.

References 

Rivers of the Wheatbelt region